Hyslop and Ronald was a Canadian brass era steam fire engine manufacturer, based in Chatham, Ontario.

They established a factory in a two-story building on Adelaide Street, about halfway between McGregor Creek and King Street.

The factory was taken over by Chatham Motor Car Company in 1906.

The company also produced other machinery.

Notes 

Defunct motor vehicle manufacturers of Canada
Defunct companies of Ontario
1900s cars
Fire service vehicle manufacturers
Truck manufacturers of Canada
History of manufacturing in Ontario